The Sámi (also spelled Sami or Saami) are the traditionally Sámi-speaking people inhabiting the region of Sápmi, which today encompasses large northern parts of Norway, Sweden, Finland, and of the Kola Peninsula in Russia. The region of Sápmi was formerly known as Lapland, and the Sámi have historically been known in English as Lapps or Laplanders, but these terms are regarded as offensive by the Sámi, who prefer the area's name in their own languages, e.g. Northern Sámi . Their traditional languages are the Sámi languages, which are classified as a branch of the Uralic language family.

Traditionally, the Sámi have pursued a variety of livelihoods, including coastal fishing, fur trapping, and sheep herding. Their best-known means of livelihood is semi-nomadic reindeer herding.  about 10% of the Sámi were connected to reindeer herding, which provides them with meat, fur, and transportation; around 2,800 Sámi people were actively involved in reindeer herding on a full-time basis in Norway. For traditional, environmental, cultural, and political reasons, reindeer herding is legally reserved for only Sámi in some regions of the Nordic countries.

Etymologies

Sámi
Other Sámi languages use cognate words. As of around 2014, the current consensus among specialists was that the word Sámi was borrowed from the Proto-Baltic word , meaning 'land' (cognate with Slavic , of the same meaning).

The Finnish word for Finland, is also thought probably to derive ultimately from Proto-Baltic , though the precise route is debated and proposals usually involve complex processes of borrowing and reborrowing.  and its adjectival form  must come from /.

The Sámi institutions—notably the parliaments, radio and TV stations, theatres, etc.—all use the term Sámi, including when addressing outsiders in Norwegian, Swedish, Finnish, or English. In Norwegian and Swedish, the Sámi are today referred to by the localized form .

Finn

The first probable historical mention of the Sámi, naming them , was by Tacitus, about AD 98.

The etymology is somewhat uncertain, but the consensus seems to be that it is related to Old Norse , from proto-Germanic  ('to find'), the logic being that the Sámi, as hunter-gatherers "found" their food, rather than grew it. This etymology has superseded older speculations that the word might be related to fen.

As Old Norse gradually developed into the separate Scandinavian languages, Swedes apparently took to using Finn to refer to inhabitants of what is now Finland, while the Sámi came to be called Lapps. Finnish immigrants to Northern Norway in the 18th and 19th centuries were referred to as Kvens to distinguish them from the Sámi "Finns". Ethnic Finns are a distinct group from Sámi.

Lapp

The word Lapp can be traced to Old Swedish , Icelandic  (plural) perhaps of Finnish origin; compare Finnish  "Lapp",  "Lapland" (possibly meaning "wilderness in the north"), the original meaning being unknown. In fact, Saxo never explicitly connects the Sámi with the "two Laplands".

The Sámi are often known in other languages by the exonyms Lap, Lapp, or Laplanders, although these are considered derogatory terms by some, while others accept at least the name Lappland. Variants of the name Lapp were originally used in Sweden and Finland and, through Swedish, adopted by many major European languages: ; German, ; ; ; ; ; ; ; ; ; .

As already mentioned, Finn is a common element in Norwegian (particularly Northern Norwegian) place names, whereas Lapp is exceedingly rare.

Terminological issues in Finnish are somewhat different. This can be confusing for foreign visitors because of the similar lives Finns and Sámi people live today in Lapland.  is also a common family name in Finland. In Finnish,  is the most commonly used word nowadays, especially in official contexts.

History

The western Uralic languages are believed to spread from the region along the Volga, which is the longest river in Europe.  The speakers of Finnic and Sámi languages have their roots in the middle and upper Volga region in the Corded Ware culture. These groups presumably started to move to the northwest from the early home region of the Uralic peoples in the second and third quarters of the 2nd millennium BC. On their journey, they used the ancient river routes of northern Russia. Some of these peoples, who may have originally spoken the same western Uralic language, stopped and stayed in the regions between Karelia, Ladoga and Lake Ilmen, and even further to the east and to the southeast. The groups of these peoples that ended up in the Finnish Lakeland from 1600 to 1500 BC later "became" the Sámi. The Sámi people arrived in their current homeland some time after the beginning of the Common Era.

The Sámi language first developed on the southern side of Lake Onega and Lake Ladoga and spread from there. When the speakers of this language extended to the area of modern-day Finland, they encountered groups of peoples who spoke a number of smaller ancient languages (Paleo-Laplandic languages), which later became extinct. However, these languages left traces in the Sámi language (Pre-Finnic substrate). As the language spread further, it became segmented into dialects. The geographical distribution of the Sámi has evolved over the course of history. From the Bronze Age, the Sámi occupied the area along the coast of Finnmark and the Kola Peninsula. This coincides with the arrival of the Siberian genome to Estonia and Finland, which may correspond with the introduction of the Finno-Ugric languages in the region.

Petroglyphs and archeological findings such as settlements, dating from about 10,000 BC can be found in Lapland and Finnmark, although these have not been demonstrated to be related to the Sámi people. These hunter-gatherers of the late Paleolithic and early Mesolithic were named Komsa by the researchers.

Relationship between the Sámi and the Scandinavians
The Sámi have a complex relationship with the Scandinavians (known as Norse people in the medieval era), the dominant peoples of Scandinavia, who speak Scandinavian languages and who founded and thus dominated the kingdoms of Norway and Sweden in which most Sámi people live. While the Sámi have lived in Fennoscandia for around 3,500 years, Sámi settlement of Scandinavia does not predate Norse/Scandinavian settlement of Scandinavia, as sometimes popularly assumed. The migration of Germanic-speaking peoples to Southern Scandinavia happened independently and separate from the later Sámi migrations into the northern regions. For centuries, the Sámi and the Scandinavians had relatively little contact; the Sámi primarily lived in the inland of northern Fennoscandia, while Scandinavians lived in southern Scandinavia and gradually colonised the Norwegian coast; from the 18th and especially the 19th century, the governments of Norway and Sweden started to assert sovereignty more aggressively in the north, and targeted the Sámi with Scandinavization policies aimed at forced assimilation from the 19th century. Before the era of forced Scandinavization policies, the Norwegian and Swedish authorities had largely ignored the Sámi and did not interfere much in their way of life. While Norwegians moved north to gradually colonise the coast of modern-day Troms og Finnmark to engage in an export-driven fisheries industry prior to the 19th century, they showed little interest in the harsh and non-arable inland populated by reindeer-herding Sámi. Unlike the Norwegians on the coast who were strongly dependent on their trade with the south, the Sámi in the inland lived off the land. From the 19th century Norwegian and Swedish authorities started to regard the Sámi as a "backward" and "primitive" people in need of being "civilized", imposing the Scandinavian languages as the only valid languages of the kingdoms and effectively banning Sámi language and culture in many contexts, particularly schools.

Southern limits of Sámi settlement in the past

How far south the Sámi extended in the past has been debated among historians and archeologists for many years. The Norwegian historian Yngvar Nielsen, commissioned by the Norwegian government in 1889 to determine this question in order to settle contemporary questions of Sámi land rights, concluded that the Sámi had lived no farther south than Lierne in Nord-Trøndelag county until around 1500, when they started moving south, reaching the area around Lake Femund in the 18th century. This hypothesis is still accepted among many historians, but has been the subject of scholarly debate in the 21st century. In recent years, several archaeological finds indicate a Sámi presence in southern Norway in the Middle Ages, and in southern Sweden, including finds in Lesja, in Vang, in Valdres and in Hol and Ål in Hallingdal. Proponents of the Sámi interpretations of these finds assume a mixed population of Norse and Sámi people in the mountainous areas of southern Norway in the Middle Ages.

Origins of the Norwegian Sea Sámi

Bubonic plague

Until the arrival of bubonic plague in northern Norway in 1349, the Sámi and the Norwegians occupied very separate economic niches. The Sámi hunted reindeer and fished for their livelihood. The Norwegians, who were concentrated on the outer islands and near the mouths of the fjords, had access to the major European trade routes so that, in addition to marginal farming in the Nordland, Troms, and Finnmark counties, they were able to establish commerce, trading fish for products from the south. According to old Nordic texts, the Sea Sámi and the Mountain Sámi are two classes of the same people and not two different ethnic groups, as had been erroneously believed.

This socioeconomic balance greatly changed when bubonic plague came to northern Norway in December 1349. The Norwegians were closely connected to the greater European trade routes, along which the plague traveled; consequently, they were infected and died at a far higher rate than Sámi in the interior. Of all the states in the region, Norway suffered the most from this plague. Depending on the parish, 60 to 76 percent of northern Norwegian farms were abandoned following the plague, while land-rents, another measure of population, dropped to 9–28% of pre-plague levels. Although the population of northern Norway is sparse compared to southern Europe, the disease spread just as fast. The spread of the plague-carrying flea (Xenopsylla cheopsis) from the south was facilitated by the transport of wooden barrels holding wheat, rye, or wool, where the fleas were able to live, and even reproduce, for several months at a time. The Sámi lived on fish and reindeer meat, and did not eat wheat or rye. They lived in communities detached from the Norwegians; being only loosely connected to the European trade routes, they fared far better than the Norwegians.

Fishing industry

Fishing has always been the main livelihood for the many Sámi living permanently in coastal areas. Archeological research shows that the Sámi have lived along the coast and once lived much farther south in the past, and they were also involved in work other than reindeer herding (e.g., fishing, agriculture, iron work). The fishing along the north Norwegian coast, especially in the Lofoten and Vesterålen islands, is quite productive, with a variety of fish; during medieval times, it was a major source of income for both the fishermen and the Norwegian monarchy. With such massive population drops caused by the Black Death, the tax revenues from this industry greatly diminished. Because of the huge profits that could be had from these fisheries, the local authorities offered incentives to the Sámi—faced with their own population pressures—to settle on the newly vacant farms. This started the economic division between the Sea Sámi (sjøsamene), who fished extensively off the coast, and the Mountain Sámi (fjellsamene, innlandssamene), who continued to hunt reindeer and small-game animals. They later herded reindeer. Even as late as the early 18th century, there were many Sámi who were still settling on these farms left abandoned from the 1350s. After many years of continuous migration, these Sea Sámi became far more numerous than the reindeer-herding mountain Sámi, who today only make up 10% of all Sámi. In contemporary times, there are also ongoing consultations between the Government of Norway and the Sámi Parliament regarding the right of the coastal Sámi to fish in the seas on the basis of historical use and international law. State regulation of sea fisheries underwent drastic change in the late 1980s. The regulation linked quotas to vessels and not to fishers. These newly calculated quotas were distributed free of charge to larger vessels on the basis of the amount of the catch in previous years, resulting in small vessels in Sámi districts falling outside the new quota system to a large degree.

Mountain Sámi
As the Sea Sámi settled along Norway's fjords and inland waterways, pursuing a combination of farming, cattle raising, trapping and fishing, the minority Mountain Sámi continued to hunt wild reindeer. Around 1500, they started to tame these animals into herding groups, becoming the well-known reindeer nomads, often portrayed by outsiders as following the traditional Sámi lifestyle. The Mountain Sámi had to pay taxes to three states, Norway, Sweden and Russia, as they crossed each border while following the annual reindeer migrations; this caused much resentment over the years. Between 1635 and 1659, the Swedish crown forced Swedish conscripts and Sámi cart drivers to work in the Nasa silver mine, causing many Sámis to emigrate from the area to avoid forced labour. As a result, the population of Pite- and Lule-speaking Sámi decreased greatly.

Post-1800s

For long periods of time, the Sámi lifestyle thrived because of its adaptation to the Arctic environment. Indeed, throughout the 18th century, as Norwegians of Northern Norway suffered from low fish prices and consequent depopulation, the Sámi cultural element was strengthened, since the Sámi were mostly independent of supplies from Southern Norway.

During the 19th century, the pressure of Christianization of the Sámi increased, with some Sámi adopting Laestadianism. With the introduction of seven compulsory years of school in 1889, the Sámi language and traditional way of life came increasingly under pressure from forced cultural normalization. Strong economic development of the north also ensued, giving Norwegian culture and language higher status.

On the Swedish and Finnish sides, the authorities were less militant, although the Sámi language was forbidden in schools and strong economic development in the north led to weakened cultural and economic status for the Sámi. From 1913 to 1920, the Swedish race-segregation political movement created a race-based biological institute that collected research material from living people and graves. Throughout history, Swedish settlers were encouraged to move to the northern regions through incentives such as land and water rights, tax allowances, and military exemptions.

The strongest pressure took place from around 1900 to 1940, when Norway invested considerable money and effort to assimilate Sámi culture. Anyone who wanted to buy or lease state lands for agriculture in Finnmark had to prove knowledge of the Norwegian language and had to register with a Norwegian name. This caused the dislocation of Sámi people in the 1920s, which increased the gap between local Sámi groups (something still present today) that sometimes has the character of an internal Sámi ethnic conflict. In 1913, the Norwegian parliament passed a bill on "native act land" to allocate the best and most useful lands to Norwegian settlers. Another factor was the scorched earth policy conducted by the German army, resulting in heavy war destruction in northern Finland and northern Norway in 1944–45, destroying all existing houses, or kota, and visible traces of Sámi culture. After World War II, the pressure was relaxed, though the legacy was evident into recent times, such as the 1970s law limiting the size of any house Sámi people were allowed to build. 

The controversy over the construction of the hydro-electric power station in Alta in 1979 brought Sámi rights onto the political agenda. In August 1986, the national anthem ("Sámi soga lávlla") and flag (Sámi flag) of the Sámi people were created. In 1989, the first Sámi parliament in Norway was elected. In 2005, the Finnmark Act was passed in the Norwegian parliament giving the Sámi parliament and the Finnmark Provincial council a joint responsibility of administering the land areas previously considered state property. These areas (96% of the provincial area), which have always been used primarily by the Sámi, now belong officially to the people of the province, whether Sámi or Norwegian, and not to the Norwegian state.

Contemporary issues
The indigenous Sámi population is a mostly urbanised demographic, but a substantial number live in villages in the high Arctic. The Sámi are still coping with the cultural consequences of language and culture loss caused by generations of Sámi children being taken to missionary and/or state-run boarding schools and the legacy of laws that were created to deny the Sámi rights (e.g., to their beliefs, language, land and to the practice of traditional livelihoods). The Sámi are experiencing cultural and environmental threats, including: oil exploration, mining, dam building, logging, climate change, military bombing ranges, tourism and commercial development.

Natural resource extraction
Sápmi is rich in precious metals, oil, and natural gas. Mining activities and prospecting to extract these resources from the region often interfere with reindeer grazing and calving areas and other aspects of traditional Sámi life. Some active mining locations include ancient Sámi spaces that are designated as ecologically protected areas, such as the Vindelfjällen Nature Reserve. The Sámi Parliament has opposed and rejected mining projects in the Finnmark area, and demanded that resources and mineral exploration benefit local Sámi communities and populations, as the proposed mines are in Sámi lands and will affect their ability to maintain their traditional livelihood. In Kallak (Sámi: Gállok) a group of indigenous and non-indigenous activists protested against the UK-based mining company Beowulf which operated a drilling program in lands used for grazing reindeer during the winter. There is often local opposition to new mining projects where environmental impacts are perceived to be very large, as very few plans for mine reclamation have been made. In Sweden, taxes on minerals are intentionally low in an effort to increase mineral exploration for economic benefit, though this policy is at the expense of Sámi populations. ILO Convention No. 169 would grant rights to the Sámi people to their land and give them power in matters that affect their future.

In Russia's Kola Peninsula, vast areas have already been destroyed by mining and smelting activities, and further development is imminent. This includes oil and natural gas exploration in the Barents Sea. Oil spills affect fishing and the construction of roads. There is a gas pipeline that stretches across the Kola Peninsula, and power lines cut off access to reindeer calving grounds and sacred sites.

In northern Finland, there has been a longstanding dispute over the destruction of forests, which prevents reindeer from migrating between seasonal feeding grounds and destroys supplies of lichen that grow on the upper branches of older trees. This lichen is the reindeer's only source of sustenance during the winter months, when snow is deep. The logging has been under the control of the state-run forest system. Greenpeace, reindeer herders, and Sámi organisations carried out a historic joint campaign, and in 2010, Sámi reindeer herders won some time as a result of these court cases. Industrial logging has now been pushed back from the most important forest areas either permanently or for the next 20 years, though there are still threats, such as mining and construction plans of holiday resorts on the protected shorelines of Lake Inari.

Land rights

The Swedish government has allowed the world's largest onshore wind farm to be built in Piteå, in the Arctic region where the Eastern Kikkejaure village has its winter reindeer pastures. The wind farm will consist of more than 1,000 wind turbines and an extensive road infrastructure, which means that the feasibility of using the area for winter grazing in practice is impossible. Sweden has received strong international criticism, including by the UN Racial Discrimination Committee and the Human Rights Committee, that Sweden violates Sámi landrättigheter (land rights), including by not regulating industry. In Norway some Sámi politicians (for example—Aili Keskitalo) suggest giving the Sámi Parliament a special veto right on planned mining projects.

Government authorities and NATO have built bombing-practice ranges in Sámi areas in northern Norway and Sweden. These regions have served as reindeer calving and summer grounds for thousands of years, and contain many ancient Sámi sacred sites.

Water rights
State regulation of sea fisheries underwent drastic change in the late 1980s. The regulation linked quotas to vessels and not to fishers. These newly calculated quotas were distributed free of cost to larger vessels on the basis of the amount of the catch in previous years, resulting in small vessels in Sámi districts falling outside the new quota system to a large degree.

The Sámi recently stopped a water-prospecting venture that threatened to turn an ancient sacred site and natural spring called Suttesaja into a large-scale water-bottling plant for the world market—without notification or consultation with the local Sámi people, who make up 70 percent of the population. The Finnish National Board of Antiquities has registered the area as a heritage site of cultural and historical significance, and the stream itself is part of the Deatnu/Tana watershed, which is home to Europe's largest salmon river, an important source of Sámi livelihood.

In Norway, government plans for the construction of a hydroelectric power plant in the Alta river in Finnmark in northern Norway led to a political controversy and the rallying of the Sámi popular movement in the late 1970s and early 1980s. As a result, the opposition in the Alta controversy brought attention to not only environmental issues but also the issue of Sámi rights.

Climate change and the environment

Reindeer have major cultural and economic significance for indigenous peoples of the North. The human-ecological systems in the North, like reindeer pastoralism, are sensitive to change, perhaps more than in virtually any other region of the globe, due in part to the variability of the Arctic climate and ecosystem and the characteristic ways of life of indigenous Arctic peoples.

The 1986 Chernobyl nuclear disaster caused nuclear fallout in the sensitive Arctic ecosystems and poisoned fish, meat and berries. Lichens and mosses are two of the main forms of vegetation in the Arctic and are highly susceptible to airborne pollutants and heavy metals. Since many do not have roots, they absorb nutrients, and toxic compounds, through their leaves. The lichens accumulated airborne radiation, and 73,000 reindeer had to be killed as "unfit" for human consumption in Sweden alone. The government promised Sámi indemnification, which was not acted upon by government.

Radioactive wastes and spent nuclear fuel have been stored in the waters off the Kola Peninsula, including locations that are only "two kilometers" from places where Sámi live. There are a minimum of five "dumps" where spent nuclear fuel and other radioactive waste are being deposited in the Kola Peninsula, often with little concern for the surrounding environment or population.

Tourism
The tourism industry in Finland has been criticized for turning Sámi culture into a marketing tool by promoting opportunities to experience "authentic" Sámi ceremonies and lifestyle. At many tourist locales, non-Sámi dress in inaccurate replicas of Sámi traditional clothing, and gift shops sell crude reproductions of Sámi handicraft. One popular "ceremony", crossing the Arctic Circle, actually has no significance in Sámi spirituality. To some Sámi, this is an insulting display of cultural exploitation.

Discrimination against the Sámi
The Sámi have for centuries, even today, been the subject of discrimination and abuse by the dominant cultures in the nations they have historically inhabited. They have never been a single community in a single region of Sápmi, which until recently was considered only a cultural region.

Norway has been criticized internationally for the politics of Norwegianization of and discrimination against the Sámi. On 8 April 2011, recommendations from the UN Racial Discrimination Committee were delivered to Norway, addressing many issues related to the legacy of Norwegianization policies, including the need for more Sámi language education, interpreters, and cultural support. One committee recommendation was that discrimination against someone based upon their language be added to Article 1 of the Norwegian Discrimination and Accessibility Act. A new present status report was to have been ready by the end of 2012. In 2018, The Storting commissioned The Truth and Reconciliation Commission to lay the foundation for recognition of the experiences of the Sámi subject to Norwegianization and the subsequent consequences.

Sweden has faced similar criticism for its Swedification policies, which began in the 1800s and lasted until the 1970s. In 2020, Sweden funded the establishment of an independent truth commission to examine and document past abuse of Sámi by the Swedish state. In 2021, the Church of Sweden made a formal apology to Sweden's Sámi population for its role in forced conversions and Swedification efforts, outlining a multiyear reconciliation plan.

In Finland, where Sámi children, like all Finnish children, are entitled to day care and language instruction in their own language, the Finnish government has denied funding for these rights in most of the country, including in Rovaniemi, the largest municipality in Finnish Lapland. Sámi activists have pushed for nationwide application of these basic rights.

As in the other countries claiming sovereignty over Sámi lands, Sámi activists' efforts in Finland in the 20th century achieved limited government recognition of the Sámis' rights as a recognized minority, but the Finnish government has maintained its legally enforced premise that the Sámi must prove their land ownership, an idea incompatible with and antithetical to the traditional reindeer-herding Sámi way of life. This has effectively allowed the Finnish government to take without compensation, motivated by economic gain, land occupied by the Sámi for centuries.

Official Sámi policies

Norway

The Sámi have been recognized as an indigenous people in Norway (1990 according to ILO convention 169 as described below), and therefore, according to international law, the Sámi people in Norway are entitled special protection and rights. The legal foundation of the Sámi policy is:
 Article 110a of the Norwegian Constitution.
 The Sámi Act (12 June 1987, No. 56.)

The constitutional amendment states: "It is the responsibility of the authorities of the State to create conditions enabling the Sámi people to preserve and develop its language, culture and way of life." This provides a legal and political protection of the Sámi language, culture and society. In addition the "amendment implies a legal, political and moral obligation for Norwegian authorities to create an environment conducive to the Sámis themselves influencing on the development of the Sámi community".

The Sámi Act provides special rights for the Sámi people:
 "... the Sámis shall have their own national Sámi Parliament elected by and amongst the Sámis" (Chapter 1–2).
 The Sámi people shall decide the area of activity of the Norwegian Sámi Parliament.
 The Sámi and Norwegian languages have equal standing in Norway (section 15; Chapter 3 contains details with regards to the use of the Sámi language).

The Norwegian Sámi Parliament also elects 50% of the members to the board of the Finnmark Estate, which controls 95% of the land in the county of Finnmark.

In addition, the Sámi have special rights to reindeer husbandry. In 2007, the Norwegian Parliament passed the new Reindeer Herding Act acknowledging siida as the basic institution regarding land rights, organization, and daily herding management.

Norway has also accepted international conventions, declarations and agreements applicable to the Sámi as a minority and indigenous people including:
 The International Covenant on Civil and Political Right (1966). Article 27 protects minorities, and indigenous peoples, against discrimination: "In those states in which ethnic, religious or linguistic minorities exist, persons belonging to such minorities, shall not be denied the right, in community with the other members of their group, to enjoy their own culture, to profess and practice their own religion, or use their own language."
 ILO Convention No. 169 concerning Indigenous and Tribal Peoples in Independent Countries (1989). The convention states that rights for the indigenous peoples to land and natural resources are recognized as central for their material and cultural survival. In addition, indigenous peoples should be entitled to exercise control over, and manage, their own institutions, ways of life and economic development in order to maintain and develop their identities, languages and religions, within the framework of the states in which they live.
 The International Convention on the Elimination of All Forms of Racial Discrimination (1965).
 The UN Convention on the Rights of the Child (1989).
 The UN Convention on the Elimination of All Forms of Discrimination against Women (1979).
 The Council of Europe's Framework Convention for the Protection of National Minorities (1995).
 The Council of Europe's Charter for Regional and Minority Languages (1992).
 The UN Declaration on the Rights of Indigenous Peoples (2007).

Sweden

Sweden recognised the existence of the "Sámi nation" in 1989, but the ILO Indigenous and Tribal Peoples Convention, C169 has not been adopted. The Sametingslag was established as the Swedish Sámi Parliament on 1 January 1993. In 1998, Sweden formally apologized for the wrongs committed against the Sámi.

Sámi is one of five national minority languages recognized by Swedish law. The Compulsory School Ordinance states that Sámi pupils are entitled to be taught in their native language; however, a municipality is only obliged to arrange mother-tongue teaching in Sámi if a suitable teacher is available and the pupil has a basic knowledge of Sámi.

In 2010, after 15 years of negotiation, Laponiatjuottjudus, an association with Sámi majority control, will govern the UNESCO World Heritage Site Laponia. The reindeer-herding law will apply in the area as well.

Finland

The act establishing the Finnish Sámi Parliament (Finnish: Saamelaiskäräjät) was passed on 9 November 1973. Sámi people have had very little representation in Finnish national politics. In fact, in 2007, Janne Seurujärvi, a Finnish Centre Party representative, became the first Sámi ever to be elected to the Finnish Parliament.

Finland ratified the 1966 U.N. Covenant on Civil and Political Rights though several cases have been brought before the U.N. Human Rights Committee. Of those, 36 cases involved a determination of the rights of individual Sámi in Finland and Sweden. The committee decisions clarify that Sámi are members of a minority within the meaning of Article 27 and that deprivation or erosion of their rights to practice traditional activities that are an essential element of their culture do come within the scope of Article 27. Finland recognized the Sámi as a "people" in 1995, but has yet to ratify ILO Convention 169 Concerning Indigenous and Tribal Peoples.

Sámi in Finland have had access to Sámi language instruction in some schools since the 1970s, and language rights were established in 1992. There are three Sámi languages spoken in Finland: North Sámi, Skolt Sámi and Inari Sámi. Of these languages, Inari Sámi, which is spoken by about 350 speakers, is the only one that is used entirely within the borders of Finland, mainly in the municipality of Inari.

The case of J. Lansman versus Finland concerned a challenge by Sámi reindeer herders in northern Finland to the Finnish Central Forestry Board's plans to approve logging and construction of roads in an area used by the herdsmen as winter pasture and spring calving grounds. Finland has denied any aboriginal rights or land rights to the Sámi people; in Finland, non-Sámi can herd reindeer.

Russia

The 1822 Statute of Administration of Non-Russians in Siberia asserted state ownership over all the land in Siberia and then "granted" possessory rights to the natives. Governance of indigenous groups, and especially collection of taxes from them, necessitated protection of indigenous peoples against exploitation by traders and settlers. During the Soviet era, the inhabitants of the Kola tundra were forcibly relocated to kolkhoz'es (collective communities) by the state; most Sámi were settled at Lujávri (Lovozero).

The 1993 Constitution, Article 69 states, "The Russian Federation guarantees the rights of small indigenous peoples in accordance with the generally accepted principles and standards of international law and international treaties of the Russian Federation." For the first time in Russia, the rights of indigenous minorities were established in the 1993 Constitution.

The Russian Federation ratified the 1966 U.N. Covenant on Civil and Political Rights; Section 2 explicitly forbids depriving a people of "its own means of subsistence." The Russian Duma (parliament) has adopted partial measures to implement it. The Russian Federation lists distinct indigenous peoples as having special rights and protections under the Constitution and federal laws and decrees. These rights are linked to the category known since Soviet times as the malochislennye narody ("small-numbered peoples"), a term that is often translated as "indigenous minorities", which include Arctic peoples such as the Sámi, Nenets, Evenki, and Chukchi.

In April 1999, the Russian Duma passed a law that guarantees socio-economic and cultural development to all indigenous minorities, protecting traditional living places and acknowledging some form of limited ownership of territories that have traditionally been used for hunting, herding, fishing, and gathering activities. The law, however, does not anticipate the transfer of title in fee simply to indigenous minorities. The law does not recognize development rights, some proprietary rights including compensation for damage to the property, and limited exclusionary rights. It is not clear, however, whether protection of nature in the traditional places of inhabitation implies a right to exclude conflicting uses that are destructive to nature or whether they have the right to veto development.

The Russian Federation's Land Code reinforces the rights of numerically small peoples ("indigenous minorities") to use places they inhabit and to continue traditional economic activities without being charged rent. Such lands cannot be allocated for unrelated activities (which might include oil, gas, and mineral development or tourism) without the consent of the indigenous peoples. Furthermore, indigenous minorities and ethnic groups are allowed to use environmentally protected lands and lands set aside as nature preserves to engage in their traditional modes of land use.

Regional law, Code of the Murmansk Oblast, calls on the organs of state power of the oblast to facilitate the native peoples of the Kola North, specifically naming the Sámi, "in realization of their rights for preservation and development of their native language, national culture, traditions and customs." The third section of Article 21 states: "In historically established areas of habitation, Sámi enjoy the rights for traditional use of nature and [traditional] activities."

Throughout the Russian North, indigenous and local people have difficulties with exercising control over resources upon which they and their ancestors have depended for centuries. The failure to protect indigenous ways, however, stems not from inadequacy of the written law, but rather from the failure to implement existing laws. Violations of the rights of indigenous peoples continue, and oil, gas, and mineral development and other activities, (mining, timber cutting, commercial fishing, and tourism) that bring foreign currency into the Russian economy. The life ways and economy of indigenous peoples of the Russian North are based upon reindeer herding, fishing, terrestrial and sea mammal hunting, and trapping. Many groups in the Russian Arctic are semi-nomadic, moving seasonally to different hunting and fishing camps. These groups depend upon different types of environment at differing times of the year, rather than upon exploiting a single commodity to exhaustion. Throughout northwestern Siberia, oil and gas development has disturbed pastureland and undermined the ability of indigenous peoples to continue hunting, fishing, trapping, and herding activities. Roads constructed in connection with oil and gas exploration and development destroy and degrade pastureland, ancestral burial grounds, and sacred sites and increase hunting by oil workers on the territory used by indigenous peoples.

In the Sámi homeland on the Kola Peninsula in northwestern Russia, regional authorities closed a fifty-mile (eighty-kilometer) stretch of the Ponoi River (and other rivers) to local fishing and granted exclusive fishing rights to a commercial company offering catch-and-release fishing to sport fishers largely from abroad. This deprived the local Sámi (see Article 21 of the Code of the Murmansk Oblast) of food for their families and community and of their traditional economic livelihood. Thus, closing the fishery to locals may have violated the test articulated by the U.N. Human Rights Committee and disregarded the Land Code, other legislative acts, and the 1992 Presidential decree. Sámi are not only forbidden to fish in the eighty-kilometer stretch leased to the Ponoi River Company but are also required by regional laws to pay for licenses to catch a limited number of fish outside the lease area. Residents of remote communities have neither the power nor the resources to demand enforcement of their rights. Here and elsewhere in the circumpolar north, the failure to apply laws for the protection of indigenous peoples leads to "criminalization" of local indigenous populations who cannot survive without "poaching" resources that should be accessible to them legally.

Although indigenous leaders in Russia have occasionally asserted indigenous rights to land and resources, to date there has been no serious or sustained discussion of indigenous group rights to ownership of land. Russia has not adopted the ILO Indigenous and Tribal Peoples Convention, C169.

Nordic Sámi Convention
On 16 November 2005 in Helsinki, a group of experts, led by former Chief Justice of the Supreme Court of Norway Professor Carsten Smith, submitted a proposal for a Nordic Sámi Convention to the annual joint meeting of the ministers responsible for Sámi affairs in Finland, Norway and Sweden and the presidents of the three Sámi Parliaments from the respective countries. This convention recognizes the Sámi as one indigenous people residing across national borders in all three countries. A set of minimum standards is proposed for the rights of developing the Sámi language and culture and rights to land and water, livelihoods and society. The convention has not yet been ratified in the Nordic countries.

Culture
To make up for past suppression, the authorities of Norway, Sweden and Finland now make an effort to build up Sámi cultural institutions and promote Sámi culture and language.

Duodji (craft)

Duodji, the Sámi handicraft, originates from the time when the Sámis were self-supporting nomads, believing therefore that an object should first and foremost serve a purpose rather than being primarily decorative. Men mostly use wood, bone, and antlers to make items such as antler-handled scrimshawed Sámi knives, drums, and guksi (burl cups). Women used leather and roots to make items such as gákti (clothing), and birch- and spruce-root woven baskets.

Clothing

Gákti are the traditional clothing worn by the Sámi people. The gákti is worn both in ceremonial contexts and while working, particularly when herding reindeer.

Traditionally, the gákti was made from reindeer leather and sinews, but nowadays, it is more common to use wool, cotton, or silk. Women's gákti typically consist of a dress, a fringed shawl that is fastened with 1–3 silver brooches, and boots/shoes made of reindeer fur or leather. Sámi boots (or nutukas) can have pointed or curled toes and often have band-woven ankle wraps. Eastern Sámi boots have a rounded toe on reindeer-fur boots, lined with felt and with beaded details. There are different gákti for women and men; men's gákti have a shorter "jacket-skirt" than a women's long dress. Traditional gákti are most commonly in variations of red, blue, green, white, medium-brown tanned leather, or reindeer fur. In winter, there is the addition of a reindeer fur coat and leggings, and sometimes a poncho (luhkka) and rope/lasso.

The colours, patterns and the jewellery of the gákti indicate where a person is from, if a person is single or married, and sometimes can even be specific to their family. The collar, sleeves and hem usually have appliqués in the form of geometric shapes. Some regions have ribbonwork, others have tin embroidery, and some Eastern Sámi have beading on clothing or collar. Hats vary by sex, season, and region. They can be wool, leather, or fur. They can be embroidered, or in the East, they are more like a beaded cloth crown with a shawl. Some traditional shamanic headgear had animal hides, plaits, and feathers, particularly in East Sápmi.

The gákti can be worn with a belt; these are sometimes band-woven belts, woven, or beaded. Leather belts can have scrimshawed antler buttons, silver concho-like buttons, tassels, or brass/copper details such as rings. Belts can also have beaded leather pouches, antler needle cases, accessories for a fire, copper rings, amulets, and often a carved and/or scrimshawed antler handled knife. Some Eastern Sámi also have a hooded jumper (малиц) from reindeer skins with wool inside and above the knee boots.

Media and literature

 There are short daily news bulletins in Northern Sámi on national TV in Norway, Sweden and Finland. Children's television shows in Sámi are also frequently made. There is also a radio station for Northern Sámi, which has some news programs in the other Sámi languages.
 A single daily newspaper is published in Northern Sámi, Ávvir, along with a few magazines.
 There is a Sámi theatre, Beaivvaš, in Kautokeino on the Norwegian side, as well as in Kiruna on the Swedish side. Both tour the entire Sámi area with drama written by Sámi authors or international translations.
 A number of novels and poetry collections are published every year in Northern Sámi, and sometimes in the other Sámi languages as well. The largest Sámi publishing house is Davvi Girji.
 The first secular book published in a Sámi language was Johan Turi's Muitalus sámiid birra (An Account of the Sámi), released in 1910 with text in Northern Sámi and Danish.
In 2023 Sámi author Ann-Helén Laestadius wrote "Stolen" a novel of the Sámi in Sweden.

Music

A characteristic feature of Sámi musical tradition is the singing of joik. Joiks are song-chants and are traditionally sung a cappella, usually sung slowly and deep in the throat with apparent emotional content of sorrow or anger. Joiks can be dedicated to animals and birds in nature, special people or special occasions, and they can be joyous, sad or melancholic. They often are based on syllablic improvisation. In recent years, musical instruments frequently accompany joiks. The only traditional Sámi instruments that were sometimes used to accompany joik are the "fadno" flute (made from reed-like Angelica archangelica stems) and hand drums (frame drums and bowl drums).

Education
 Education with Sámi as the first language is available in all four countries, and also outside the Sámi area.
 Sámi University College is located in Kautokeino. Sámi language is studied in several universities in all countries, most notably the University of Tromsø, which considers Sámi a mother tongue, not a foreign language.

Festivals
 Numerous Sámi festivals throughout the Sápmi area celebrate different aspects of the Sámi culture. Among the most festive are the Easter festivals taking place in Kautokeino and Karasjok before the springtime reindeer migration to the coast. These festivals combine traditional culture with modern phenomena such as snowmobile races. They celebrated the new year known as Ođđajagemánnu.

Visual arts
In addition to Duodji (Sámi handicraft), there is a developing area of contemporary Sámi visual art. Galleries such as Sámi Dáiddaguovddáš (Sami Center for Contemporary Art) are being established.

Dance
Unlike many other Indigenous peoples, traditional dance is generally not a visible manifestation of Sámi identity. This has led to a common misconception that Sámi, at least in western Sápmi, have no traditional dance culture.

The Sámi modern dance company Kompani Nomad looked to old descriptions of shamanistic rituals and behaviors to identify "lost" Sámi dances and reimagine them through contemporary dance. An example is the lihkadus (ecstasy dance) described in sources from the 16th and 17th centuries, but which was adapted by Swedish–Sámi priest Lars Levi Laestadius, who brought it and other Sámi traditions into the Church of Sweden as part of the Laestadianism movement.

Partner and group dancing have been a part of Skolt Sámi culture and among Sámi on the Kola Peninsula since at least the second half of the 1800s. These square dances, couple dances, circle dances, and singing games are influenced by Karelian and Northern Russian dance cultures, likely under the influence of Russian traders, military service under the tsar, and the Russian Orthodox Church. This eastern Sápmi dance tradition has been more continuous and has been adapted by modern Sámi dance companies such as Johtti Kompani.

Reindeer husbandry

Reindeer husbandry has been and still is an important aspect of Sámi culture. Traditionally the Sámi lived and worked in reindeer herding groups called siidat, which consist of several families and their herds. Members of the siida helped each other with the management and husbandry of the herds. During the years of forced assimilation, the areas in which reindeer herding was an important livelihood were among the few where the Sámi culture and language survived.

Today in Norway and Sweden, reindeer husbandry is legally protected as an exclusive Sámi livelihood, such that only persons of Sámi descent with a linkage to a reindeer herding family can own, and hence make a living off, reindeer. Presently, about 2,800 people are engaged in reindeer herding in Norway. In Finland, reindeer husbandry is not exclusive and is also practiced to a limited degree by ethnic Finns. Legally, it is restricted to EU/EEA nationals resident in the area. In the north (Lapland), it plays a major role in the local economy, while its economic impact is lesser in the southern parts of the area (Province of Oulu).

Among the reindeer herders in Sámi villages, the women usually have a higher level of formal education in the area.

Games
The Sámi have traditionally played both card games and board games, but few Sámi games have survived, because Christian missionaries and Laestadianists considered such games sinful. Only the rules of three Sámi board games have been preserved into modern times. Sáhkku is a running-fight board game where each player controls a set of soldiers (referred to as "women" and "men") that race across a board in a loop, attempting to eliminate the other player's soldiers. The game is related to South Scandinavian daldøs, Arabian tâb and Indian tablan. Sáhkku differs from these games in several respects, most notably the addition of a piece – "the king" – that changes gameplay radically. Tablut is a pure strategy game in the tafl family. The game features "Swedes" and a "Swedish king" whose goal is to escape, and an army of "Muscovites" whose goal is to capture the king. Tablut is the only tafl game where a relatively intact set of rules have survived into our time. Hence, all modern versions of tafl (commonly called "Hnefatafl" and marketed exclusively as "Norse" or "Viking" games) are based on the Sámi game of tablut. Dablot Prejjesne is a game related to alquerque which differs from most such games (e.g. draughts) by having pieces of three different ranks. The game's two sides are referred to as "Sámi" (king, prince, warriors) and "Finlenders" (landowners, landowner's son, farmers).

Cultural region

Sápmi is located in Northern Europe, includes the northern parts of Fennoscandia and spans four countries: Norway, Sweden, Finland, and Russia. Non-Sámi and many regional maps have often called this same region Lapland as there is considerable regional overlap between Sápmi and the provinces of Lappland in Sweden and Lapland in Finland. Much of Sápmi falls outside of those provinces. Despite the terms use in tourism, Lapland can be either misleading or offensive, or both, to Sámi, depending on the context and where this word is used. Among the Sámi people, Sápmi is strictly used and acceptable.

Extent

There is no official geographic definition for the boundaries of Sápmi. However, the following counties and provinces are usually included:
 Finnmark county in Norway
 Jämtland county in Sweden
 Lapland region in Finland
 Murmansk oblast in Russia
 Nord-Trøndelag county in Norway
 Nordland county in Norway
 Norrbotten county in Sweden
 Troms county in Norway
 Västerbotten county in Sweden

The municipalities of Gällivare, Jokkmokk and Arjeplog in Swedish Lappland were designated a UNESCO World Heritage Site in 1996 as a "Laponian Area".

The Sámi Domicile Area in Finland consists of the municipalities of Enontekiö, Utsjoki and Inari as well as a part of the municipality of Sodankylä. About 3,000 of Finland's about 10,000 people speak Sámi as their mother tongue. Today, a considerable part of the Finnish Sámi live outside the Sápmi region, for example in Helsinki there is a relatively large and active Sámi minority. According to the Sámi Parliament, the Sámi live in 230 municipalities out of a total of 336 municipalities in Finland. 75% of Sámi under the age of 10 live outside the Sápmi region.

Important Sámi towns

The following towns and villages have a significant Sámi population or host Sámi institutions (Norwegian, Swedish, Finnish or Russian name in parentheses):
 Aanaar, Anár, or Aanar (Inari), is the location of the Finnish Sámi Parliament, Sajos Sámi Cultural Centre, SAKK –  (Sámi Education Institute), Anarâškielâ servi (Inari Sámi Language Association), and the Inari Sámi Siida Museum.
 Aarborte (Hattfjelldal) is a southern Sámi center with a Southern Sámi-language school and a Sámi culture center.
 Árjepluovve (Arjeplog) is the Pite Saami center in Sweden.
 Deatnu (Tana) has a significant Sámi population.
 Divtasvuodna (Tysfjord) is a center for the Lule-Sámi population. The Árran Lule-Sámi center is located here.
 Gáivuotna (Kåfjord, Troms) is an important center for the Sea-Sámi culture. Each summer the Riddu Riđđu festival is held in Gáivuotna. The municipality has a Sámi-language center and hosts the Ája Sámi Center. The opposition against Sámi language and culture revitalization in Gáivuotna was infamous in the late 1990s and included Sámi-language road signs being shot to pieces repeatedly.
 Giron (Kiruna), proposed seat of the Swedish Sámi Parliament.
 Guovdageaidnu (Kautokeino) is perhaps the cultural capital of the Sámi. About 90% of the population speaks Sámi. Several Sámi institutions are located in Kautokeino including: Beaivváš Sámi Theatre, a Sámi secondary school and reindeer-herding School, the Sámi University College, the Nordic Sámi Research Institute, the Sámi Language Board, the Resource Centre for the Rights of Indigenous People, and the International Centre for Reindeer Husbandry. In addition, several Sámi media are located in Kautokeino including the Sámi-language Áššu newspaper, and the DAT Sámi publishing house and record company. Kautokeino also hosts the, which includes the Sámi Grand Prix 2010 (Sámi Musicfestival) and the Reindeer Racing World Cup. The Kautokeino rebellion in 1852 is one of the few Sámi rebellions against the Norwegian government's oppression against the Sámi.
 Iänudâh, or Eanodat (Enontekiö).
 Jiellevárri, or Váhčir (Gällivare)

 Jåhkåmåhkke (Jokkmokk) holds a Sámi market on the first weekend of every February and has a Sámi school for language and traditional knowledge called Samij Åhpadusguovdásj.
 Kárášjohka (Karasjok) is the seat of the Norwegian Sámi Parliament. Other important Sámi institutions are located in Kárášjohka, including NRK Sámi Radio, the Sámi Collections museum, the Sámi Art Centre, the Sámi Specialist Library, the Mid-Finnmark legal office, a child and adolescent psychiatry outpatient clinic – one of few on a national level approved for providing full specialist training. Other significant institutions include a Sámi Specialist Medical Centre, and the Sámi Health Research Institute. In addition, the Sápmi cultural park is in the township, and the Sámi-language Min Áigi newspaper is published here.
 Leavdnja (Lakselv) in Porsáŋgu (Porsanger) municipality is the location of the Finnmark Estate and the Ságat Sámi newspaper. The Finnmarkseiendommen organization owns and manages about 95% of the land in Finnmark, and 50% of its board members are elected by the Norwegian Sámi Parliament.
 Луя̄ввьр (Lovozero)
 Staare (Östersund) is the center for the Southern Sámi people living in Sweden. It is the site for Gaaltije – centre for South Sámi culture – a living source of knowledge for South Sámi culture, history and business. Staare also hosts the Sámi Information Centre and one of the offices to the Sámi Parliament in Sweden.
 Njauddâm is the center for the Skolt Sámi of Norway, which have their own museum Äʹvv in the town.
 Ohcejohka (Utsjoki).
 Snåase (Snåsa) is a center for the Southern Sámi language and the only municipality in Norway where Southern Sámi is an official language. The Saemien Sijte Southern Sámi museum is located in Snåase.
 Unjárga (Nesseby) is an important center for the Sea Sámi culture. It is also the site for the Várjjat Sámi Museum and the Norwegian Sámi Parliament's department of culture and environment. The first Sámi to be elected into the Norwegian Parliament, Isak Saba, was born there.
 Árviesjávrrie (Arvidsjaur). New settlers from the south of Sweden did not arrive until the second half of the 18th century. Because of that, Sámi tradition and culture has been well preserved. Sámi people living in the south of Norrbotten, Sweden, use the city for Reindeer herding during the summer. During winter they move the Reindeers to the coast, to Piteå.

Demographics

In the geographical area of Sápmi, the Sámi are a small population. According to some, the estimated total Sámi population is about 70,000. One problem when attempting to count the population of the Sámi is that there are few common criteria of what "being a Sámi" constitutes. In addition, there are several Sámi languages and additional dialects, and there are several areas in Sapmi where few of the Sámi speak their native language due to the forced cultural assimilation, but still consider themselves Sámi. Other identity markers are kinship (which can be said to, at some level or other, be of high importance for all Sámi), the geographical region of Sápmi where their family came from, and/or protecting or preserving certain aspects of Sámi culture.

All the Nordic Sámi Parliaments have included as the "core" criterion for registering as a Sámi the identity in itself—one must declare that one truly considers oneself a Sámi. Objective criteria vary, but are generally related to kinship and/or language.

Still, due to the cultural assimilation of the Sámi people that had occurred in the four countries over the centuries, population estimates are difficult to measure precisely. The population has been estimated to be between 80,000 and 135,000 across the whole Nordic region, including urban areas such as Oslo, Norway, traditionally considered outside Sápmi. The Norwegian state recognizes any Norwegian as Sámi if he or she has one great-grandparent whose home language was Sámi, but there is not, and has never been, any registration of the home language spoken by Norwegian people.

Roughly half of all Sámi live in Norway, but many live in Sweden, with smaller groups living in the far north of Finland and the Kola Peninsula of Russia. The Sámi in Russia were forced by the Soviet authorities to relocate to a collective called Lovozero/Lujávri, in the central part of the Kola Peninsula.

Language

There is no single Sámi language, but a group of ten distinct Sámi languages. Six of these languages have their own written standards. The Sámi languages are relatively closely related, but not mutually intelligible; for instance, speakers of Southern Sámi cannot understand Northern Sámi. Especially earlier, these distinct languages were referred to as "dialects", but today, this is considered misleading due to the deep differences between the varieties. Most Sámi languages are spoken in several countries, because linguistic borders do not correspond to national borders.

All Sámi languages are at some degree of endangerment, ranging from what UNESCO defines as "definitely endangered" to "extinct". This is due in part to historic laws prohibiting the use of Sámi languages in schools and at home in Sweden and Norway. Sámi languages, and Sámi song-chants, called joiks, were illegal in Norway from 1773 until 1958. Then, access to Sámi instruction as part of schooling was not available until 1988. Special residential schools that would assimilate the Sámi into the dominant culture were established. These were originally run by missionaries, but later, controlled by the government. For example, in Russia, Sámi children were taken away when aged 1–2 and returned when aged 15–17 with no knowledge of their language and traditional communities. Not all Sámi viewed the schools negatively, and not all of the schools were brutal. However, being taken from home and prohibited from speaking Sámi has resulted in cultural alienation, loss of language, and lowered self-esteem.

The Sámi languages belong to the Uralic language family, linguistically related to Finnish, Estonian, and Hungarian. Due to prolonged contact and import of items foreign to Sámi culture from neighboring Scandinavians, there are a number of Germanic loanwords in Sámi, particularly for "urban" objects. The majority of the Sámi now speak the majority languages of the countries they live in, i.e., Swedish, Russian, Finnish and Norwegian. Efforts are being made to further the use of Sámi languages among Sámi and persons of Sámi origin. Despite these changes, the legacy of cultural repression still exists. Many older Sámi still refuse to speak Sámi. In addition, Sámi parents still feel alienated from schools and hence do not participate as much as they could in shaping school curricula and policy.

In Norway, the name of the language is samisk, and the name of the people is Same; in Finland, the name of the language is spelled saame and the name of the people saamelainen.

American scientist Michael E. Krauss published in 1997 an estimate of Sámi population and their languages.

Kemi Sámi language became extinct in the 19th century.

Many Sámi do not speak any of the Sámi languages any more due to historical assimilation policies, so the number of Sámi living in each area is much higher.

Division by geography
Sápmi is traditionally divided into:
 Eastern Sápmi (Inari, Skolt, Akkala, Kildin and Teri Sámi in Kola peninsula (Russia) and Inari (Finland, formerly also in eastern Norway)
 Northern Sápmi (Northern, Lule and Pite Sámi in most of northern parts of Norway, Sweden and Finland)
 Southern Sápmi (Ume and Southern Sámi in central parts of Sweden and Norway)

It should also be noted that many Sámi now live outside Sápmi, in large cities such as Oslo in Norway.

Division by occupation
A division often used in Northern Sámi is based on occupation and the area of living. This division is also used in many historical texts:
 Reindeer Sámi or Mountain Sámi (in Northern Sámi boazosapmelash or badjeolmmosh). Previously nomadic Sámi living as reindeer herders. Now most have a permanent residence in the Sámi core areas. Some 10% of Sámi practice reindeer herding, which is seen as a fundamental part of a Sámi culture and, in some parts of the Nordic countries, can be practiced by Sámis only.
 Sea Sámi (in Northern Sámi mearasapmelash). These lived traditionally by combining fishing and small-scale farming. Today, often used for all Sámi from the coast regardless of their occupation.
 Forest Sámi who traditionally lived by combining fishing in inland rivers and lakes with small-scale reindeer-herding.
 City Sámi who are now probably the largest group of Sámi.

Division by country

According to the Norwegian Sámi Parliament, the Sámi population of Norway is 40,000. If all people who speak Sámi or have a parent, grandparent, or great-grandparent who speaks or spoke Sámi are included, the number reaches 70,000. As of 2021, 20,545 people were registered to vote in the election for the Sámi Parliament in Norway. The bulk of the Sámi live in Finnmark and Northern Troms, but there are also Sámi populations in Southern Troms, Nordland and Trøndelag. Due to recent migration, it has also been claimed that Oslo is the municipality with the largest Sámi population. The Sámi are in a majority only in the municipalities of Guovdageaidnu–Kautokeino, Kárášjohka–Karasjok, Porsáŋgu–Porsanger, Deatnu–Tana and Unjárga–Nesseby in Finnmark, and Gáivuotna–Kåfjord in Northern Troms. This area is also known as the Sámi core area, and Sámi and Norwegian are co-equal administrative languages here.

According to the Swedish Sámi Parliament, estimates of the size of the Sámi population of Sweden ranges from 20,000 to 40,000. As of 2021, 9,226 people were registered to vote in elections to the Swedish Sámi Parliament.

According to the Finnish Population Registry Center and the Finnish Sámi Parliament, the Sámi population living in Finland was 10,753 in 2019. As of 31 December 2021, only 2,023 people were registered as speaking a Sámi language as their mother tongue.

According to the 2010 All-Russia Census, the Sámi population of Russia was 1,771.

Sámi diaspora outside of Sápmi

There are an estimated 30,000 people living in North America who are either Sámi, or descendants of Sámi. Most have settled in areas that are known to have Norwegian, Swedish and Finnish immigrants. Some of these concentrated areas are Minnesota, North Dakota, Iowa, Wisconsin, the Upper Peninsula of Michigan, Illinois, California, Washington, Utah and Alaska; and throughout Canada, including Saskatchewan, Manitoba and Northern Ontario, and the Canadian territories of the Northwest Territories, Yukon and Nunavut.

Descendants of these Sámi immigrants typically know little of their heritage because their ancestors purposely hid their indigenous culture to avoid discrimination from the dominating Scandinavian or Nordic culture. Some of these Sámi are part of a diaspora that moved to North America in order to escape assimilation policies in their home countries. There were also several Sámi families that were brought to North America with herds of reindeer by the U.S. and Canadian governments as part of the "Reindeer Project" designed to teach the Inuit about reindeer herding. There is a long history of Sámi in Alaska.

Some of these Sámi immigrants and descendants of immigrants are members of the Sami Siida of North America.

Organization
Sápmi demonstrates a distinct semi-national identity that transcends the borders between Norway, Sweden, Finland and Russia. There is no movement for sovereign state, but they do seek greater autonomy in respective nation states.

Sámi Parliaments

The Sámi Parliaments (Sámediggi in Northern Sámi, Sämitigge in Inari Sámi, Sää'mte'ǧǧ in Skolt Sámi) founded in Finland (1973), Norway (1989) and Sweden (1993) are the representative bodies for peoples of Sámi heritage. Russia has not recognized the Sámi as a minority and, as a result, recognizes no Sámi parliament, even if the Sámi people there have formed an unrecognised Sámi Parliament of Russia. There is no single, unified Sámi parliament that spans across the Nordic countries. Rather, each of the aforementioned three countries has set up its own separate legislatures for Sámi people, even though the three Sámi Parliaments often work together on cross-border issues. In all three countries, they act as an institution of cultural autonomy for the indigenous Sámi people. The parliaments have very weak political influence, far from autonomy. They are formally public authorities, ruled by the Scandinavian governments, but have democratically elected parliamentarians, whose mission is to work for the Sámi people and culture. Candidates' election promises often get into conflict with the institutions' submission under their governments, but as authorities, they have some influence over the government.

Norwegian organizations
The main organisations for Sámi representation in Norway are the siidas. They cover northern and central Norway.

Swedish organizations
The main organisations for Sámi representation in Sweden are the siidas. They cover northern and central Sweden.

Finnish organizations
In contrast to Norway and Sweden, in Finland, a siida (paliskunta in Finnish) is a reindeer-herding corporation that is not restricted by ethnicity. There are indeed some ethnic Finns who practice reindeer herding, and in principle, all residents of the reindeer herding area (most of Finnish Lapland and parts of Oulu province) who are citizens of EEA countries, i.e., the European Union and Norway, Iceland and Liechtenstein, are allowed to join a paliskunta.

Russian organizations
In 2010, the Sámi Council supported the establishment of a cultural center in Russia for Arctic peoples. The Center for Northern Peoples aims to promote artistic and cultural cooperation between the Arctic peoples of Russia and the Nordic countries, with particular focus on indigenous peoples and minorities.

Border conflicts

Sápmi, the Sámi traditional lands, cross four national borders. Traditional summer and winter pastures sometimes lie on different sides of the borders of the nation-states. In addition to that, there is a border drawn for modern-day Sápmi. Some state that the rights (for reindeer herding and, in some parts, even for fishing and hunting) include not only modern Sápmi but areas that are beyond today's Sápmi that reflect older territories. Today's "borders" originate from the 14th to 16th centuries when land-owning conflicts occurred. The establishment of more stable dwelling places and larger towns originates from the 16th century and was performed for strategic defence and economic reasons, both by peoples from Sámi groups themselves and more southern immigrants.

Owning land within the borders or being a member of a siida (Sámi corporation) gives rights. A different law enacted in Sweden in the mid-1990s gave the right to anyone to fish and hunt in the region, something that was met with skepticism and anger amongst the siidas.

Court proceedings have been common throughout history, and the aim from the Sámi viewpoint is to reclaim territories used earlier in history. Due to a major defeat in 1996, one siida has introduced a sponsorship "Reindeer Godfather" concept to raise funds for further battles in courts. These "internal conflicts" are usually conflicts between non-Sámi land owners and reindeer owners. Cases question the Sámi ancient rights to reindeer pastures. In 2010, Sweden was criticized for its relations with the Sámi in the Universal Periodic Review conducted by the Working Group of the Human Rights Council.

The question whether the fjeld's territory is owned by the governments (crown land) or by the Sámi population is not answered.

From an indigenous perspective, people "belong to the land", the land does not belong to people, but this does not mean that hunters, herders, and fishing people do not know where the borders of their territories are located as well as those of their neighbors.

Sámi identity symbols
Although the Sámi have considered themselves to be one people throughout history, the idea of Sápmi, a Sámi nation, first gained acceptance among the Sámi in the 1970s, and even later among the majority population. During the 1980s and 1990s, a Sámi flag was created, a Sámi anthem was written, and the date of a national day was established.

The Sámi Flag

The Sámi flag was inaugurated during the Sámi Conference in Åre, Sweden, on 15 August 1986. It was the result of a competition for which many suggestions were entered. The winning design was submitted by the artist Astrid Båhl from Skibotn, Norway.

The motif (shown right) was derived from the shaman's drum and the poem "Päiven Pārne ("Sons of the Sun") by the South Sámi Anders Fjellner describing the Sámi as sons and daughters of the sun. The flag has the Sámi colours, red, green, yellow and blue, and the circle represents the sun (red) and the moon (blue).

The Sámi People's Day

The Sámi National Day falls on 6 February as this date was when the first Sámi congress was held in 1917 in Trondheim, Norway. This congress was the first time that Norwegian and Swedish Sámi came together across their national borders to work together to find solutions for common problems. The resolution for celebrating on 6 February was passed in 1992 at the 15th Sámi congress in Helsinki. Since 1993, Norway, Sweden and Finland have recognized 6 February as Sámi National Day.

"Song of the Sámi People"

"" ("Song of the Sámi People") was originally a poem written by Isak Saba that was published in the newspaper Saǥai Muittalægje for the first time on 1 April 1906. In August 1986, it became the Sámi anthem. Arne Sørli set the poem to music, which was then approved at the 15th Sámi Conference in Helsinki in 1992. "" has been translated into all of the Sámi languages.

Religion

Many Sámi people continued to practice their religion up until the 18th century. Most Sámi today belong to the state-run Lutheran churches of Norway, Sweden and Finland. Some Sámi in Russia belong to the Russian Orthodox Church, and similarly, some Skolt Sámi resettled in Finland are also part of an Eastern Orthodox congregation, with an additional small population in Norway.

Indigenous Sámi religion
Indigenous Sámi religion is a type of polytheism. (See Sámi deities.) There is some diversity due to the wide area that is Sápmi, allowing for the evolution of variations in beliefs and practices between tribes. The beliefs are closely connected to the land, animism, and the supernatural. Sámi spirituality is often characterized by pantheism, a strong emphasis on the importance of personal spirituality and its interconnectivity with one's own daily life, and a deep connection between the natural and spiritual "worlds". Among other roles, the Noaidi, or Sámi shaman, enables ritual communication with the supernatural through the use of tools such as drums, Joik, Fadno, chants, sacred objects, and fly agaric. Some practices within the Sámi religion include natural sacred sites such as mountains, springs, land formations, Sieidi, as well as man-made ones such as petroglyphs and labyrinths.

Sámi cosmology divides the universe into three worlds. The upper world is related to the South, warmth, life, and the color white. It is also the dwelling of the gods. The middle world is like the Norse Midgard, it is the dwelling of humans and it is associated with the color red. The third world is the underworld and it is associated with the color black, it represents the north, the cold and it is inhabited by otters, loons, and seals and mythical animals.

Sámi religion shares some elements with Norse mythology, possibly from early contacts with trading Vikings (or vice versa). They were the last worshippers of Thor, as late as the 18th century according to contemporary ethnographers. Through a mainly French initiative from Joseph Paul Gaimard as part of his La Recherche Expedition, Lars Levi Læstadius began research on Sámi mythology. His work resulted in Fragments of Lappish Mythology, since by his own admission, they contained only a small percentage of what had existed. The fragments were termed Theory of Gods, Theory of Sacrifice, Theory of Prophecy, or short reports about rumorous Sami magic and Sami sagas. Generally, he claims to have filtered out the Norse influence and derived common elements between the South, North, and Eastern Sámi groups. The mythology has common elements with other indigenous religions as well—such as those of indigenous peoples in Siberia and North America.

Christian mission

The term Sámi religion usually refers to the traditional religion, practiced by most Sámi until approximately the 18th century. Christianity was introduced by Roman Catholic missionaries as early as the 13th century. Increased pressure came after the Protestant Reformation, and rune drums were burned or sent to museums abroad. In this period, many Sámi practiced their traditional religion at home, while going to church on Sunday. Since the Sámi were considered to possess "witchcraft" powers, they were often accused of sorcery during the 17th century and were the subjects of witchcraft trials and burnings.

In Norway, a major effort to convert the Sámi was made around 1720, when Thomas von Westen, the "Apostle of the Sámi", burned drums, burned sacred objects, and converted people. Out of the estimated thousands of drums before this period, only about 70 are known to remain today, scattered in museums around Europe. Sacred sites were destroyed, such as sieidi (stones in natural or human-built formations), álda and sáivu (sacred hills), springs, caves and other natural formations where offerings were made.

In the far east of the Sámi area, the Russian monk Trifon converted the Sámi in the 16th century. Today, St. George's chapel in Neiden, Norway (1565), testifies to this effort.

Laestadius

Around 1840 Swedish Sámi Lutheran pastor and administrator Lars Levi Laestadius initiated among the Sámi a puritanical pietist movement emphasizing complete abstinence from alcohol. This movement is still very dominant in Sámi-speaking areas. Laestadius spoke many languages, and he became fluent and preached in Finnish and Northern Sámi in addition to his native Southern Sámi and Swedish, the language he used for scholarly publications.

Two great challenges Laestadius had faced since his early days as a church minister were the indifference of his Sámi parishioners, who had been forced by the Swedish government to convert from their shamanistic religion to Lutheranism, and the misery caused them by alcoholism. The spiritual understanding Laestadius acquired and shared in his new sermons "filled with vivid metaphors from the lives of the Sámi that they could understand, ... about a God who cared about the lives of the people" had a profound positive effect on both problems. One account from a Sámi cultural perspective recalls a new desire among the Sámi to learn to read and a "bustle and energy in the church, with people confessing their sins, crying and praying for forgiveness ... [Alcohol abuse] and the theft of [the Sámis'] reindeer diminished, which had a positive influence on the Sámi's relationships, finances and family life."

Neo-shamanism and traditional healing
Today there are a number of Sámi who seek to return to the traditional Pagan values of their ancestors. There are also some Sámi who claim to be noaidi and offer their services through newspaper advertisements, in New Age arrangements, or for tourist groups. While they practice a religion based on that of their ancestors, widespread anti-pagan prejudice has caused these shamans to be generally not viewed as part of an unbroken Sámi religious tradition. Traditional Sámi beliefs are composed of three intertwining elements: animism, shamanism, and polytheism. Sámi animism is manifested in the Sámi's belief that all significant natural objects (such as animals, plants, rocks, etc.) possess a soul; and from a polytheistic perspective, traditional Sámi beliefs include a multitude of spirits. Many contemporary practitioners are compared to practitioners of neo-paganism, as a number of neopagan religions likewise combine elements of ancient pagan religions with more recent revisions or innovations, but others feel they are attempting to revive or reconstruct indigenous Sámi religions as found in historic, folkloric sources and oral traditions.

In 2012, County Governor of Troms approved Shamanic Association of Tromsø as a new religion.

A very different religious idea is represented by the numerous "wise men" and "wise women" found throughout the Sámi area. They often offer to heal the sick through rituals and traditional medicines and may also combine traditional elements, such as older Sámi teachings, with newer monotheistic inventions that Christian missionaries taught their ancestors, such as readings from the Bible.

Genetic studies

Anthropologists have been studying the Sámi people for hundreds of years for their assumed physical and cultural differences from the rest of the Europeans. Recent genetic studies have indicated that the two most frequent maternal lineages of the Sámi people are the haplogroups V (Neolithic in Europe and not found in Finland 1500 years ago) and U5b (ancient in Europe). Y-chromosome haplogroup N-VL29 makes up 20%, came from Siberia 3500 years ago. Y-chromosome N-Z1936 makes up similarly about 20%, and likely came from Siberia with the Sámi language, but slightly later than N-VL29. This tallies with archeological evidence suggesting that several different cultural groups made their way to the core area of Sámi from 8000 to 6000 BC, presumably including some of the ancestors of present-day Sámi.

The Sámi have been found to be genetically unrelated to people of the Pitted Ware culture. The Pitted Ware culture are in turn genetically continuous with the original Scandinavian Hunter-Gatherers.

History of scientific research carried out on the Sámi

The genetic makeup of Sámi people has been extensively studied for as long as such research has been in existence. Ethnographic photography of the Sámi began with the invention of the camera in the 19th century. This continued on into the 1920s and 1930s, when Sámi were photographed naked and anatomically measured by scientists, with the help of the local police—sometimes at gunpoint—to collect data that would justify their own racial theories. Thus, there is a degree of distrust by some in the Sámi community towards genetic research.

Examples of discriminatory actions include the Statens Institut for Rasbiologi compulsory sterilization project on the basis of race, which continued until 1975, and Sámi graves being plundered to provide research materials, of which their remains and artifacts from this period from across Sápmi can still be found in various state collections. In the late 19th century, colonial fascination with Arctic peoples led to human beings exhibited in human zoos. Sámi people were exhibited with their traditional lavvu tents, weapons, and sleds, beside a group of reindeer at Tierpark Hagenbeck and other zoos across the globe.

Notable people of Sámi descent

Science

 Ante Aikio (born 1977), in Northern Sámi Luobbal Sámmol Sámmol Ánte, Finnish-Sámi linguist specializing in Uralic languages, historical linguistics, Sámi languages and Sámi prehistory at the Sámi University of Applied Sciences in Kautokeino, Norway.
 Louise Bäckman (1926–2021) Born in Tärnaby, Ume Sámi speaker. Professor emerita in Religious Studies. She has carried out several studies of pre-Christian religion among the Sámi and has made contributions in the study of Sámi sociology and language.

 Israel Ruong (1903–1986) Born in Arjeplog. A Swedish-Sámi linguist, politician and professor of Sámi languages and culture at the University of Uppsala in Sweden. Israel Ruong spoke Pite Sámi as his mother tongue.
 Ande Somby (1958–present) Born in Buolbmat. A University Researcher, artist, cofounder of DAT.

Explorers and adventurers

 Samuel Balto (1861–1921), Arctic explorer—one of the first people to cross Greenland on skis (together with Nansen)—and gold miner. The very famous dog Balto was named after Samuel Balto.
 Lars Monsen (1963–present) adventurer, explorer, journalist and author.

Literature

 Ella Holm Bull (1929–2006), author, musician, schoolteacher.
 Anders Fjellner (1795–1876), Protestant priest and poet. Wrote down the mythological joik that inspired the Sámi flag.
 Ailo Gaup (1944–2014), an author and neo-shaman who participated in founding the Beaivváš Sámi Theatre.

 Isak Mikal Saba (1875–1925), politician and writer. Was the first Sámi parliamentarian (Norwegian Labour Party) and wrote the Sámi national anthem.
 Olaus Sirma (1655–1719), the first Sámi poet known by name.
 Johan Turi (1854–1936), wrote first secular book in Sámi.
 Nils-Aslak Valkeapää (1943–2001), musician, poet and artist.

Music

 Adjagas, musical group.
 The Blacksheeps, punk rock band.
 Mari Boine (1956–present), musician.
 Ane Brun, singer and songwriter.
 Fred Buljo (1988–present), rapper, singer, joik. Member of KEiiNO and Duolva Duottar.
 Frode Fjellheim, joik musician.
 Ingor Ánte Áilo Gaup (1960–present), actor, composer, and folk musician.
 Jonne Järvelä (1974–present), musician and songwriter.
 Sofia Jannok (1982–present), performer, musician and radio host.
 Agnete Johnsen (1994–present), singer and songwriter.
 Inga Juuso (1945–2014), singer and actress.
 Gustav Kappfjell (1913–1999), Sámi joiker and artist. Also noted for being part of the resistance movement during WW2.
 Joni Mitchell (1943–present), musician and painter.
 Mikkâl Morottaja (1984–present), rap musician.

 Jaco Pastorius (1951–1987), influential American jazz musician, composer and electric bass player.
 John Persen (1941–2014), composer.
 Ulla Pirttijärvi (1971–present), joik singer.
 Roger Pontare (1951–present), musician.
 Wimme Saari (1959–present), musician.
 Ánde Somby, Sámi musician and law professor.
 Lisa Cecilia Thomasson-Bosiö, or Lapp-Lisa (1878–1932), singer.
 Vajas, musical group.
 Niko Valkeapää (1968–present), musician and songwriter.
 Nils-Aslak Valkeapää (1943–2001), musician, poet and artist.

Film and theatre

 Mikkel Gaup, actor.
 Nils Gaup (1955–present), film director. Well-known films include Ofelaš (Pathfinder), which was nominated for an Academy Award, and the 2008 film Kautokeino-Opprøret, based on the Kautokeino Rebellion.
 Jalmari Helander (1976), Finnish screenwriter and film director.
 Lance Henriksen (1940), actor of Norwegian parentage; his grandmother was Sámi.
 Anni-Kristiina Juuso (1979–present), actress.
 Sara Margrethe Oskal (born 1970), actress, film director
 Lene Cecilia Sparrok (1997), Norwegian actress of Sámi descent.
 Elle-Máijá Tailfeathers, Canadian filmmaker, Indigenous rights activist, and actress of Sámi and Blackfoot heritage, on her father's and mother's sides, respectively. Works in multiple genres including experimental, documentary, drama, and action.
 Onni Tommila (1999), Finnish actor.
 Tommy Wirkola (1979), Norwegian filmmaker of Finnish Sámi descent.
 Renée Zellweger (1969), Oscar-winning actress whose Norwegian mother is of partial Sámi descent.

Politics and society

 Lars Levi Laestadius (1800–61), religious reformer, botanist and ethnologist.
 Ole Henrik Magga (1947–present), politician. The first President of the Norwegian Sámi Parliament (NSR) and first Chairman of the UN Permanent Forum on Indigenous Issues.
 Helga Pedersen (1973–present) politician. The first Sámi member of Government (Minister of Fisheries and Coastal Affairs, Norwegian Labour Party).
 Elsa Laula Renberg (1877–1931), politician and activist. Organized the first international Sámi conference and wrote a rhetorically powerful pamphlet of resistance to colonization.
 Isak Mikal Saba (1875–1925), politician and writer. Was the first Sámi parliamentarian (Norwegian Labour Party) and wrote the Sámi national anthem.
 Janne Seurujärvi (1975–present), politician. The first Sámi member of Parliament of Finland.
 Irja Seurujärvi-Kari (born 1947), politician and academic; member of the Finnish Sámi Parliament.
 Laila Susanne Vars (1976–present), former vice-president of the Sámi Parliament in Norway, first Sámi woman with a PhD in law, member of the UN Expert Mechanism on the Rights of Indigenous Peoples (EMRIP), rector of the Sámi University of Applied Sciences.

Visual arts

 Simen Johan (1973–present), Visual Artist. Born in Kirkenes, Norway, lives and works in New York City
 , artist.
 Joni Mitchell (1943–present) musician and painter. Unconfirmed.
 Nils-Aslak Valkeapää (1943–2001), musician, poet and artist.

Sports

 Ailo Gaup (1980–present), a motorcross sportsman who invented the "underflip".
 John Halvorsen, athletics.
 Leo Komarov (1987–present), Finnish ice hockey player for the Toronto Maple Leafs. Born in Estonia and raised in Finland and is of Russian-Sámi parentage.
 Anja Pärson (1981–present) and Jens Byggmark (1985–present), alpine skiers.
 Morten Gamst Pedersen (1981–present), Football player (former player for Blackburn Rovers).
 Jon Rønningen, wrestler. Olympic gold medalist.
 Lars Rønningen, wrestler.
 Börje Salming (1951–2022), legendary NHL defenseman, member of Hockey Hall of Fame, voted to the IIHF all-century team.

Other

 , the single noble family of Sámi descent (Swedish nobility).
 , famous criminal.

See also
 Environmental racism in Europe
 Hamburg culture
 List of indigenous peoples
 Reindeer in Russia
Sampo Lappelill

Sámi culture
 Fourth World
 Inari
 Indigenous small-numbered peoples of the North, Siberia and the Far East
 Knud Leem
 Sámi cuisine
 Sápmi Park – Located Karasjok, Norway, Sápmi Park and visitor center presents the Sámi culture and its history through exhibits and a special effect theater presentation, entitled "The Magic Theater" designed originally by award-winning experience designer Bob Rogers (designer) and the design team BRC Imagination Arts.
 Ume Sámi language

Sámi films
 The White Reindeer (Valkoinen peura) (1952), a Finnish horror drama film set in Finnish Lapland, among the Sámi people.
 Pathfinder (Ofelaš) (1988), film nominated for the Academy Award for Best Foreign Film; filmed in Norway featuring Sámi actors speaking in Sámi
 Give Us Our Skeletons, a 1999 documentary about the scientific racism and racial classification movement carried out on the Sámi
 The Cuckoo (Kukushka) (2002), film set during World War II with a Sámi woman as one of the main characters
 Last Yoik in Saami Forests? (2007), made for the United Nations, a documentary about land rights disputes in Finnish Lapland
 The Sami (Saamelainen) (2007), a Mushkeg Media documentary about the state of aboriginal languages
 Wolf (2008), an examination of how the traditions of the Sámi villagers in northern Sweden are confronted with modern-day society
 Herdswoman (2008), a documentary about land rights disputes in reindeer grazing areas
 The Kautokeino Rebellion (2008), feature film that concerns the ethnic-religious Sámi revolt in Guovdageaidnu of 1852
 Magic Mushrooms and Reindeer: Weird Nature (2009), short video on the use of Amanita muscaria mushrooms by the Sámi people and their reindeer, produced by the BBC
 Suddenly Sami (2009), in which the filmmaker finds out that her mother has been hiding her Arctic indigenous Sámi heritage from her
 Midnight Sun (2016), crime series which revolves around Sámi culture and conflicts of Sámi culture with modern Swedish society
 Sami Blood (2016), a movie chronicling the life of a Sámi girl taken into a Swedish boarding school to be assimilated as a Swede
 Frozen (2013), features a major character named Kristoff who wears clothing resembling Sámi attire and has a pet reindeer.
 Frozen II (2019), features the forest tribe known as the Northuldra, which is based on the Sámi people, and the theme song Vuelie, written by Norwegian joiker Frode Fjellheim and performed by Norwegian female choral group Cantus, is based on Sámi music; there is a Sámi language dubbing of the film
 Klaus (2019), animated film about "a postman stationed in a town to the North who befriends a reclusive toy-maker" featuring Sámi characters

Notes

References

Sources

Further reading
  Robert Paine (1926–2010)

Sámi books
 The Germania by Tacitus (the chapter on Fenni)
 Vigilant Ancestor: A World of Secrets Whispered in My Ear, by H. D. Rennerfeldt. .
 The Sami Peoples of the North: A Social and Cultural History, by Neil Kent. .
 The Sámi People: Traditions in Transitions, by Veli-Pekka Lehtola. .
 God Wears Many Skins: Myth and Folklore of the Sami People, by Jabez L. Van Cleef. .
 Liberating Sápmi: Indigenous Resistance in Europe's Far North, by Gabriel Kuhn. .

External links

 Saami Council
 
 Encyclopaedia of Saami Culture

 

Ethnic groups in Finland
Ethnic groups in Sweden
Ethnic groups in Norway
Ethnic groups in Russia
Finnic peoples
Indigenous peoples of Europe
Scandinavia
Pastoralists
Modern nomads
Nomadic groups in Eurasia
White Sea
Indigenous peoples in the Arctic
Indigenous small-numbered peoples of the North, Siberia and the Far East